Šetějovice is a municipality and village in Benešov District in the Central Bohemian Region of the Czech Republic. It has about 70 inhabitants.

Administrative parts
The village of Dolní Rápotice and the area of the extinct village of Žibřidovice are administrative parts of Šetějovice.

References

Villages in Benešov District